The Gnostic Society is an organization founded in Los Angeles in 1928, and incorporated in 1939, by John Morgan Pryse (1863-1952) and his brother James Morgan Pryse (1859-1942) for studies of Gnosticism. Stephan A. Hoeller, author and lecturer and a leading exponent of Gnosticism as living religious practice, has been director of studies since 1963, and is also the Bishop of the Ecclesia Gnostica.

The Gnostic Society is an educational organization "dedicated to advancing the study, understanding, and individual experience of Gnosis." Hoeller has presented regular weekly lectures for more than 30 years. Lecture programs are open to the public and presented free of charge.

References

External links
The Gnostic Society Calendar
BC Recordings - Gnostic Society Audio Lectures

Gnosticism